Domestic Spending (foaled February 24, 2017) is a British-bred American-owned multiple Grade 1 turf winning Thoroughbred racehorse. His Grade I wins include the Hollywood Derby in 2020 and Turf Classic Stakes and Manhattan Stakes in 2021.

Background

Domestic Spending is a bay gelding who was bred in Great Britain by Rabbah Bloodstock. He was sired by Kingman, a champion British Thoroughbred racehorse who was the 2014 European Horse of the Year.
His dam Urban Castle, is the only registered foal out of the stakes-winning Street Cry daughter who died in 2017. His second dam, Cloud Castle (by In the Wings), was a Group 3 winner (1998 Nell Gwyn Stakes) who twice placed in Group 1 company. She produced 11 winners. Seth Klarman's Klaravich Stables purchased Domestic Spending for the equivalent of 300,000 guineas (US$412,320) from Highclere Stud's consignment to Book 1 of the 2018 Tattersalls October Yearling Sale. The horse had to be gelded because he would not train. Kingman stands at Banstead Manor Stud in England for 150,000 Pounds (2020).

Domestic Spending is trained by Eclipse Award winning trainer Chad C. Brown.

Statistics

Legend:

 

Notes:

An (*) asterisk after the odds means Domestic Spending was the post-time favorite.

Pedigree

References

2017 racehorse births
Racehorses bred in the United Kingdom
Racehorses trained in the United States
Thoroughbred family 7-a
American Grade 1 Stakes winners